"Vital Signs" is a song by progressive rock trio Rush from their 8th studio album Moving Pictures. The lyrics of the song are about individuality and the pressures of conforming.

The song is heavily influenced by reggae (in the guitar riff) as well as progressive electronica (in its use of sequencers) and the music of The Police. These influences would carry on into their next three studio albums: Signals, Grace Under Pressure, and Power Windows.

The song was released as a single in the U.K. peaking at No 41. Also, a live version of "Vital Signs" appeared as the B-side to Rush's "New World Man" single in 1982 (Mercury #76179, US edition).

It has appeared in Rush's set lists as recently as the 2010–2011 Time Machine Tour (documented on Time Machine 2011: Live in Cleveland), during which Moving Pictures was played in its entirety. It is also noted for being played during the encore of the Grace Under Pressure Tour (documented on the Grace Under Pressure Tour Live album and video).

Reception
Classic Rock readers voted "Vital Signs" the 37th best Rush song.

See also
List of Rush songs

References 

1980 songs
Rush (band) songs
Music videos directed by Bruce Gowers
Song recordings produced by Terry Brown (record producer)
Songs written by Neil Peart
Songs written by Geddy Lee
Songs written by Alex Lifeson
1982 singles
Mercury Records singles
Reggae rock songs
Canadian new wave songs